Pandemis limitata, the three-lined leafroller, is a species of moth of the family Tortricidae. It is found in North America, where it has been recorded from Nova Scotia to British Columbia and from the east coast west to the Rocky Mountains and Arizona. It has also been recorded from Durango in Mexico.

The length of the forewings is 7–9.5 mm for males and 9–12 mm for females. The forewings are brown with fasciate markings. The hindwings are grey and white. Adults are on wing from June to August in one or two generations per year.

The larvae are leaf rollers. They feed on Acer negundo, Acer saccharinum, Alnus species (including Alnus incana and Alnus rubra), Betula species (including Betula papyrifera), Corylus species (including Corylus americana), Viburnum species, Euonymus atropurpureus, Cornus racemosa, Vaccinium species, Amorpha fruticosa, Trifolium species, Castanea species, Quercus species (including Quercus alba and Quercus macrocarpa), Myrica gale, Osmunda species, Malus species (including Malus domestica and Malus sylvestris), Prunus species (including Prunus avium and Prunus virginiana), Sorbus species, Populus species (including Populus alba, Populus balsamifera and Populus tremuloides), Salix species, Tilia americana and Ulmus species (including Ulmus americana and Ulmus rubra), and others. They feed on the terminal leaf growth and sometimes on the fruit of their host plant. Larvae reach a length of about 20 mm. They are entirely green and unmarked. Pupation takes place at the final larval feeding site.

References

 Species Pandemis limitata - Three-lined Leafroller - Hodges#3594

Moths described in 1869
Pandemis